The Canton of Tarascon is a former French canton located in the Bouches-du-Rhône département of France, in the arrondissement of Arles. It had 18,091 inhabitants (2012). It was disbanded following the French canton reorganisation which came into effect in March 2015.

Conseiller Général: Lucien Limousin (UMP)

It comprised the following communes:
 Boulbon
 Mas-Blanc-des-Alpilles
 Saint-Étienne-du-Grès
 Saint-Pierre-de-Mézoargues 
 Tarascon

References 

Tarascon
2015 disestablishments in France
States and territories disestablished in 2015